Bill Clinton (born 1946) was president of the United States from 1993 to 2001.

William Clinton may also refer to:

William de Clinton, Earl of Huntingdon (1304–1354), English Nobleman, Lord High Admiral
William Henry Clinton (1769–1846), British Army General
William Clinton (baseball) (1888–?), American baseball player

See also
 Presidency of Bill Clinton
Clinton